Robert J. Hogan may refer to:

 Robert Hogan (actor) (1933–2021), American actor
 Robert J. Hogan (author) (1897–1963), American author